Irene Gut Opdyke (born Irena Gut, 5 May 1922 – 17 May 2003) was a Polish nurse who gained international recognition for aiding Polish Jews persecuted by Nazi Germany during World War II. She was honored as a Righteous Among the Nations by Yad Vashem for risking her life to save twelve Jews from certain death.

Life
Irena Gut was born into a Catholic family with five daughters in Kozienice, Poland, during the interwar period. The family moved to Radom, where she enrolled at the nursing school before the Nazi-Soviet invasion of 1939. At the age of 20, Gut witnessed a German soldier kill an infant in 1942. This event transformed her life. During the German occupation, Gut was hired by Wehrmacht Major  to work in a kitchen of a hotel that frequently served Nazi officials. Inspired by her religious faith, Gut secretly took food from the hotel and delivered it to the Tarnopol Ghetto.

Gut smuggled Jews out of the ghetto into the surrounding forest and delivered food for them there. Meanwhile, Rügemer asked Gut to work as a housekeeper in his requisitioned villa. She hid 12 Jews in the cellar. They would come out and help her clean the house when he was not around. Rügemer found out about the Jews she was hiding. At risk to all their lives, Rügemer kept Gut's secret, on the condition that she became his mistress. Rügemer fled with the Germans in 1944 ahead of the Russian advance. Gut and several Jews also fled west from Soviet occupied Poland to Allied-occupied Germany. She was put in a Displaced Persons camp, where she met William Opdyke, a United Nations worker from New York City. She emigrated to the United States and married Opdyke shortly thereafter. They raised a family together.

Legacy 
After years of silence regarding her wartime experience, in 1975 Opdyke was convinced to speak after hearing a neo-Nazi claim that the Holocaust never occurred. Opdyke began a public speaking career which culminated in her memoir In My Hands: Memories of a Holocaust Rescuer. In 1982, she was recognized and honored by Yad Vashem as one of the Polish Righteous Among the Nations. In 2012, Eduard Rügemer was recognized and honored by Yad Vashem as one of the German Righteous Among the Nations.

Papal blessing 
On 9 June 1995, Opdyke was honored with a papal blessing from Pope John Paul II at a joint service of Jews and Catholics held at Shir Ha-Ma'alot synagogue in Irvine, California, along with an invitation from Pope John Paul II for her to have an audience with him. The papal blessing and audience with the Pope had been obtained for her by congregant Alan Boinus with the help of Monsignor Joseph Karp of the Polish Catholic Church in Yorba Linda, California. The papal blessing was the first recognition by the Roman Catholic Church of her efforts during the Holocaust. Opdyke said, "This is the greatest gift I can receive for whatever I did in my life."

ABC Primetime Live trip to Israel 
In July 1997, Opdyke traveled to Israel with her manager, Alan Boinus, and his wife, publicist Rosalie Boinus, on a television story arranged by the Boinuses for ABC Primetime Live, which aired on 10 June 1998, re-uniting Opdyke with Hermann Morks, one of the twelve Jews whose lives she saved.

On the trip, Alan Boinus arranged for private meetings with Opdyke at the Knesset with former President and Prime Minister of Israel Shimon Peres and Speaker of the Knesset Dan Tichon. Boinus also arranged for other meetings in Israel for Opdyke with Mordecai Paldiel, Director of the Department of the Righteous Among the Nations at Yad Vashem, and with Holocaust survivor Roman Haller, the baby Opdyke saved during the war by convincing his parents, Ida and Lazar Haller (two of the twelve Jews Opdyke was hiding in Rügemer's cellar), that Ida should carry the child to term after she became pregnant while hiding in the cellar. After the war, the Hallers took in Rügemer as their house guest for saving their lives. Rügemer became "Zeide" (grandfather) to Roman Haller. Roman Haller served as director of the German office of the Claims Conference, which represents world Jewry in negotiating restitution for the victims of Nazi persecution.

Memoir 
Opdyke's memoir, In My Hands: Memories of a Holocaust Rescuer (Alfred A. Knopf; later ), was arranged by her then-manager Alan Boinus and published in 1999 through Random House, with co-author Jennifer Armstrong. Alan Boinus and his wife, Rosalie Boinus, among others, are thanked by Opdyke in the acknowledgements.

Irene Gut Opdyke Holocaust Rescuer Foundation 
The Irene Gut Opdyke Holocaust Rescuer Foundation was founded in 1997 by Alan and Rosalie Boinus in honor of Opdyke to offer awards, grants, and scholarships to young people inspired by the heroic acts of Irene Gut Opdyke when she was young, so they may likewise stand up to racism, bigotry, and hate. It has since been disbanded.

Motion picture controversy 
In 1998, Opdyke's story was the subject of legal action and cross-complaint when she sought to regain the motion picture rights to her life story, which she had previously assigned in an option agreement. Copyright attorney Carole Handler represented Opdyke and worked with the parties to reach an agreement. The case was dismissed with prejudice.

Play 
A play based on the book In My Hands, Irena's Vow, opened on Broadway on 29 March 2009 to mixed reviews. It was written by Dan Gordon and starred Tovah Feldshuh as Irena Gut. It had earlier premiered off-Broadway at the Baruch Performing Arts Center in New York City. After failing to find an audience, the play closed on 28 June 2009.

Song 
In 2012, Katy Carr, a British songwriter with Polish roots, released a song inspired by Opdyke titled "Mała Little Flower" on her album Paszport. On 26 September 2012, Trojka Radio in Poland nominated it as a song of the week.

See also 
 List of individuals and groups assisting Jews during the Holocaust
 List of Polish Holocaust resisters
 Witold Pilecki, who volunteered to Auschwitz to gather intelligence on the camp from the inside
 Rescue of Jews by Poles during the Holocaust

References

External links
 Irene Gut Opdyke at Forgotten Holocaust
 Obituary in The Times (timesonline.com) 
 Transcript of obituary in The Washington Post, 21 May 2003
 2001 Interview at achuka.co.uk
  
 Irene Gut Opdyke – her activity to save Jews' lives during the Holocaust, at Yad Vashem website
 Irene Gut Opdyke Interviewed in London, January 2001.
 Irene Gut Opdyke. Times Newspapers 28 May 2003.
 Rescuer recalls horror of the Holocaust by Esther Diskin. The Virginian-Pilot 1995, Landmark Communications. 26 April 1995.
 Nazi officer's mistress risked her life to save Jews. 30 May 2003. The Telegraph, London.

1922 births
2003 deaths
Polish nurses
People from Kozienice
Catholic Righteous Among the Nations
Polish emigrants to the United States
Polish Righteous Among the Nations
Place of death missing
Female resistance members of World War II